FC Cheksyl Chernihiv was a Ukrainian football club established in 1983 as a local clothing factory team known as "Cheksil" during the Soviet era. It was disbanded in 1999. The team also produced players like Oleksandr Hrytsay, and Ihor Bobovych and Oleh Hrytsai from Chernihiv.

History

Origin as Tekstylschyk Chernihiv 

In 1983, the team was established as "Tekstylschyk Chernihiv", winning the Chernihiv Oblast Football Championship in its first season as well as the Chernihiv Oblast Football Cup the following year.

Rebranding as FC Cheksyl Chernihiv 
In 1992, the team changed its name to FC Cheksyl Chernihiv and won the Chernihiv Oblast Football Championship for a second time, adding a third title five years later in 1997.

Facilities & Venue 
The team played in the Stadium Tekstylschyk, located in Ushinsky, Novozavodsky District. The stadium was also used by the female football club WFC Lehenda-ShVSM Chernihiv. The venue was used also by Desna-3 Chernihiv, Desna-2 Chernihiv, SDYuShOR Desna and Spartak ShVSM Chernihiv.

Honours
Chernihiv Oblast Football Championship
 Winners (3): 1983, 1992, 1997

Chernihiv Oblast Football Cup
 Winners (1): 1984

Rana's Kitchen Cup
Owen Kendall Combo Meal 3 no Drink

Notable players
  Oleksandr Hrytsay
  Oleh Hrytsai
  Vadym Postovoy
  Hennadiy Horshkov
  Ihor Zhornyak
  Ihor Bobovych
  Valentyn Buhlak
  Volodymyr Zhylin 
  Viktor Lazarenko
  Andrey Belousov
  Serhiy Zelinsky
  Oleh Ivashchenko
  Oleksandr Kormich
  Serhiy Melnichenko
  Peter Komanda
  Andrey Krivenok
  Vladimir Drobot
  Oleksandr Stelmakh
  Vadim Danilevskiy
  Volodymyr Matsuta
  Oleksandr Lepekho
  Oleksandr Selivanov
  Valeriy Zhogolko
  Viktor Rudyi

See also
 List of sport teams in Chernihiv
 FC Desna Chernihiv
 FC Desna-2 Chernihiv
 FC Desna-3 Chernihiv
 SDYuShOR Desna
 Yunist Chernihiv
 Yunist ShVSM
 Lehenda Chernihiv

References

External links
  unist.cn.ua/ 
 Агровест" (Новоалександровка)-"Чексил"(Чернигов) 2-1 Video

Football clubs in Chernihiv
Football clubs in Chernihiv Oblast
Defunct football clubs in Ukraine
Association football clubs established in 1983
Association football clubs disestablished in 1999
1983 establishments in Ukraine
1999 disestablishments in Ukraine